Jindong is a locality in Western Australia's South West region in the local government area of the City of Busselton. At the 2021 census, the area had a population of 68. As part of the Group Settlement Scheme, the area had a school from 1924, which was later housed in the local hall, constructed around 1930. There is a motocross track in Jindong.

References

South West (Western Australia)